Gollob is a surname. Notable people with the surname include:

Jacek Gollob (born 1969), Polish motorcycle speedway rider 
Tomasz Gollob (born 1971), Polish motorcycle speedway rider 
Gordon Gollob (1912–1987), Nazi German ace pilot

See also
 
 Golob
 Gołąb (surname)
 Golomb